The commune of Gashoho is a commune of Muyinga Province in northeastern Burundi. The capital lies at Gashoho.

References

Communes of Burundi
Muyinga Province